Bourcefranc-le-Chapus is a commune in the Charente-Maritime department in the Nouvelle-Aquitaine region in southwestern France. The commune was created in 1908 from part of Marennes. Bourcefranc-le-Chapus is a major oyster farming port. Fort Louvois is a fortification built by Vauban on the Chapus islet in front of the town.

Population

See also
Communes of the Charente-Maritime department

References

External links

 Commune of Bourcefranc-Le Chapus

Communes of Charente-Maritime
Charente-Maritime communes articles needing translation from French Wikipedia
Populated coastal places in France